"Caramel" is a song by Blur, the tenth track on their 1999 album 13.

Song
"Caramel" was written by Damon Albarn in 1998. Like numerous songs from the album, it is about a relationship and Albarn's struggle to get over the breakup. It is also about his usage of heroin ("caramel" being a metaphor for heroin when smoked or "chased") and resultant addiction which he acquired during said relationship. It is rather experimental, and throughout the song, different short guitar lines from Graham Coxon feature. It has been noted as a highlight of the album by some critics. The review from BBC Music stated: "songs like '1992', 'Caramel' or 'No Distance Left to Run' dripped weary disaffection. This was a band now completely out of love with pop."

The song actually finishes at around 6:30, but two short instrumental hidden tracks play after. The first begins at around 6:32 and appears to be similar to the final track on the album, "Optigan 1". The next begins at 7:02 and is a more rock-style composition. It begins with the sound of a motor being started. This is believed to be done by Graham Coxon because he did a similar thing (the sound of starting a motorbike) at the start of the Kaiser Chiefs song "Saturday Night".

Usages
The song was used in an emotional scene in an episode of the drama As If in 2001. The MTV show Eminem BIORhythm also used the song at one point.

The song was played live for the first time at an invited gig that was broadcast by BBC Radio 6 Music on 31 July 2012. The band continued to play it throughout all of their 2012 gigs, consequently appearing on Parklive.

Alternate version
Another version of the song, subtitled "Ambient Version", was recorded in the 13 sessions. It is a quieter version of the song. Until its appearance on the box set Blur 21, the song was never released. It was publicly played once, when Alex James played it on blur-radio.com in 2000 during his Hour show.

Another version of the song appears to be an instrumental of the song, dubbed the William Orbit Mix. It lasts until 6:30, not including the exitludes (instrumental hidden tracks).

Critical reception
Q included it in The Real Best of... list of 10 Blur songs in 2012, where it was described as "the anatomy of a break-up set up to seven minutes of suspenseful guitars and slowly-building electronics".

The official Blur Fan Club magazine Blurb compared the song to a "classic early [1970s] rock number, that you cannot quite pinpoint" and said that like "This Is a Low", the song does not have to be a single to "achieve classic Blur status".

References

1999 songs
Blur (band) songs
Songs written by Damon Albarn
Songs written by Alex James (musician)
Songs written by Dave Rowntree
Songs written by Graham Coxon